The Civil Will–Green Party (Irgenii Zorig–Nogoon Nam) is a green liberal political party in Mongolia.

Civil Will Party

Civil Will Party was established on March 9, 2000, with Sanjaasürengiin Oyuun as chairwoman and E. Narmandakh as general secretary. The party's name is a reference to the name of S.Oyun's murdered brother Sanjaasürengiin Zorig, one of the leaders of the 1990 democratic movement.

In the 2000 legislative election, the Civil Will Party entered into a coalition with the Green Party, and won a seat in the State Great Khural. Before the 2008 legislative election, the Mongolian National Unity Party merged with the Civil Will Party. In the ensuing elections on June 29, 2008, the party won one of the 76 seats in Mongolia's parliament, while receiving 1.97% of the popular vote.

Merger
The 7th Congress of the Civil Will Party formed the Civil Will–Green Party. With the merger, the party had two members in the State Great Khural: party chairman Dangaasürengiin Enkhbat and first deputy chairwoman Sanjaasürengiin Oyuun. E. Zorigt worked as the Adviser of Nature and the Environment Affairs to the President.

During the 8th Congress of the Civil Will Party conducted on 28 January 2012, the party changed its name to the Civil Will–Green Party, and approved the decision to have up to three chairpersons, and to adopt a new flag and symbol. The changes were submitted to the Supreme Court, which were then approved on March 12, 2012.

The merger was opposed by many members, with some people blocking the application to the Supreme Court for over six months.

Government for Reform
After the 2012 election, the party obtained two seats in parliament and was one of the partners in “Government for Reform”. The long-time standing leader and party chairwoman Sanjaasürengiin Oyuun was serving as Minister for Green Development and Environment. Mr. Tumenjargal, head of the youth organisation, is Deputy Minister for Culture, Sports and Tourism. In addition the party had obtained its first seat in the Ulaanbaatar Representatives Council.

References

External links
Official Website

2000 establishments in Mongolia
Global Greens member parties
Green liberalism
Green political parties
Liberal International
Liberal parties in Asia
Political parties established in 2000
Political parties in Mongolia